Montclair is a city in the Pomona Valley, in southwestern San Bernardino County, California. The population was 36,664 in the 2010 United States Census.

History
The earliest known inhabitants of the area were from the Serrano tribe of Native Americans. The Serrano established their village along a creek named Arroyo de los Alisos, now named San Antonio Creek, which flowed along a route that is now Mills Avenue, the western border of the city.

In 1897, a "Township of Marquette" was founded within the borders of the modern city of Montclair.  In 1900, a  tract of land was surveyed and named "Monte Vista". A small settlement to the south of Monte Vista was established in 1907 and named "Narod". Throughout the first half of the 20th century, the settlement was largely devoted to citrus orchards. The Monte Vista tract experienced growth in residential development after the Second World War, and the tract was incorporated as the city of Monte Vista on April 25, 1956. Due to conflict with the Post Office, which refused to open an office in Monte Vista due to a name conflict with a community in Northern California, the city was renamed Montclair on April 8, 1958.

Geography
Montclair is bordered by Pomona to the west, Claremont and Upland to the north, Ontario to the east, and Chino to the south. Montclair, which is on the border with Los Angeles County, is in the Pomona Valley and part of the Inland Empire region.

The San Bernardino Freeway (I-10) runs through the northern part of the city.

Demographics

2010
At the 2010 census Montclair had a population of 36,664. The racial makeup of Montclair was 19,337 (52.7%) White (14.4% Non-Hispanic White), 1,908 (5.2%) African American, 434 (1.2%) Native American, 3,425 (9.3%) Asian, 74 (0.2%) Pacific Islander, 9,882 (27.0%) from other races, and 1,604 (4.4%) from two or more races. Hispanic or Latino of any race were 25,744 persons (70.2%).

The census reported that 36,268 people (98.9% of the population) lived in households, 215 (0.6%) lived in non-institutionalized group quarters, and 181 (0.5%) were institutionalized.

There were 9,523 households, 4,954 (52.0%) had children under the age of 18 living in them, 5,094 (53.5%) were opposite-sex married couples living together, 1,781 (18.7%) had a female householder with no husband present, 901 (9.5%) had a male householder with no wife present.  There were 690 (7.2%) unmarried opposite-sex partnerships, and 77 (0.8%) same-sex married couples or partnerships. 1,240 households (13.0%) were one person and 524 (5.5%) had someone living alone who was 65 or older. The average household size was 3.81.  There were 7,776 families (81.7% of households); the average family size was 4.09.

The age distribution was 10,756 people (29.3%) under the age of 18, 4,300 people (11.7%) aged 18 to 24, 10,694 people (29.2%) aged 25 to 44, 7,831 people (21.4%) aged 45 to 64, and 3,083 people (8.4%) who were 65 or older. The median age was 30.7 years. For every 100 females, there were 99.1 males. For every 100 females age 18 and over, there were 96.8 males.

There were 9,911 housing units at an average density of 1,796.4 per square mile, of the occupied units 5,683 (59.7%) were owner-occupied and 3,840 (40.3%) were rented. The homeowner vacancy rate was 2.0%; the rental vacancy rate was 4.6%. 21,076 people (57.5% of the population) lived in owner-occupied housing units and 15,192 people (41.4%) lived in rental housing units.

2000
According to the census of 2000, there were 33,049 people in 8,800 households, including 7,048 families, in the city. The population density was 6,482.4 inhabitants per square mile (2,502.0/km). The racial makeup of the city was 33.8% White, 6.4% African American, 1.0% Native American, 5.1% Asian, 0.3% Pacific Islander, 34.6% from other races, and 4.8% from two or more races. Hispanic or Latino of any race were 73.0% of the population.

Of the 8,800 households 47.5% had children under the age of 18 living with them, 46.3% were married couples living together, 26.3% had a female householder with no husband present, and 19.9% were non-families. 15.0% of households were one person and 6.3% were one person aged 65 or older.  The average household size was 3.7 and the average family size was 4.0.

The age distribution was 33.1% under the age of 18, 10.7% from 18 to 24, 30.4% from 25 to 44, 17.4% from 45 to 64, and 8.3% 65 or older.  The median age was 29 years. For every 100 females, there were 99.6 males.  For every 100 females age 18 and over, there were 96.2 males.

The median household income was $30,797 and the median family income  was $32,815. Males had a median income of $30,902 versus $27,014 for females. The per capita income for the city was $13,556. About 34.2% of families and 27.4% of individuals were below the poverty line.

Government
The current mayor is Javier "John" Dutrey, and the other members of the city council are Mayor Pro-Tem Bill Ruh, Tenice Johnson, Corysa Martinez and Benjamin "Ben" Lopez.

The City of Montclair is a General Law City and operates as a City Council-City Manager form of government, which the City Manager manages the day-to-day operations.  The City Council meeting is held on the first and third Monday of each month beginning at 7:00 p.m.

Notable residents
Nick Rimando (born 1979), retired Major Soccer League player
Vince Velasquez (born 1992), Major League Baseball pitcher for the Philadelphia Phillies
Matt Wise (born 1975), retired Major League Baseball pitcher and bullpen coach for the Los Angeles Angels

References

External links

 
Cities in San Bernardino County, California
Pomona Valley
Incorporated cities and towns in California
Populated places established in 1956
1956 establishments in California